Stottler Henke Associates, Inc., founded in 1988, is a company headquartered in San Mateo, California, that develops artificial intelligence software applications and development tools for education and training, planning and scheduling, knowledge management and discovery, decision support, and computer security and reliability.  

Scenario-based training simulations let students apply their knowledge and skills in realistically complex situations.  Intelligent tutoring systems encode and apply subject matter and teaching expertise to evaluate student performance and provide individualized instruction automatically.  Its Aurora scheduling system is used by NASA, United Space Alliance, the Boeing Company, Massachusetts General Hospital, and Clipper Windpower.

References

External links
 Company Website
 Publications
 Aurora-CCPM Multi-Project Critical Chain Project Management with Intelligent Scheduling
 SimBionic intelligent agent toolkit
 SimVentive toolkit for developing serious games and training simulations
 DataMontage data visualization system
 NASA Hallmarks of Success video
 Stottler Henke Associates Aurora scheduling system

Software companies established in 1988
Companies based in San Mateo, California
Software companies of the United States